Varezg (also Romanized as Vārezg; also known as Verzeg, Verezg, Vārīz, Vārzan, Vorzg, and Wārīz) is a village in Qaen Rural District, in the Central District of Qaen County, South Khorasan Province, Iran. At the 2006 census, its population was 586, in 169 families.

References 

Populated places in Qaen County